The 8th Arkansas Field Battery (1862–1865) was a Confederate Army artillery battery during the American Civil War. The battery spent its entire existence in the Department of the Trans-Mississippi. It was also known as Hughey's Battery.

Organization
William M. Hughey lived in Ouachita Parish, Louisiana, when the war began. He enrolled in a local mounted volunteer company very early in the war, but the company disbanded. Next Hughey joined the "McCown Guards Artillery", commanded by Capt. D. Whitaker Harris, a company organized in Lafayette County, Arkansas, and eventually designated as Company B, 1st Tennessee Heavy Artillery. Sometime in 1862, Hughey returned to Arkansas. Hughey may have accompanied General Hindman when he came to the state in May or he may have accompanied General M.M. Parson's Missouri Infantry Brigade and the artillery train that Parson brought with him in his crossing of the Mississippi. According to a Goodspeed biographical sketch, "An artillery company was raised and placed under his command, and he served under General Hindman in this capacity in the several engagements that took place in Arkansas following that date."

When General Thomas C. Hindman arrived in Arkansas in late May, 1862 to assume command of the new Trans-Mississippi District, he found almost nothing to command. He quickly began organizing new regiments, but his most pressing need was for arms for the new forces he was organizing, including the artillery. With Hindman's first order, dated May 31, 1862, at Little Rock, he announced his staff, including the appointment of Major Francis A. Shoup, Chief of Artillery. On September 29, 1862, General Hindman issued Special Order No. 8 from Little Rock which directed F. A. Shoup, now a Colonel, to take charge of the organization of the artillery from North West Arkansas and assigning certain "suitable officers to duty in the company now unorganized, and recommend them for appointment." These suitable officers included Lieutenants Huey(sic) and Miller. By November 8, 1862, Lieutenants Hughey and Miller were helping Captain James Shoup organize a battery. Special Order No. 35, from Camp on the Mulberry River, assigned the following officers to duty in "Shoup's Mountain Battery":
J. C. Shoup Captain.
W. M. Huey(sic) 1st Lieut.
W. A. Miller Jr. 1st Lieut.
G. F. Halliburton 2nd Lieut.

Shoup's Mountain Battery was involved in the Battle of Cane Hill, November 28, 1862, and the Battle of Prairie Grove on December 7, 1862. Col. Charles A. Carroll took note of Hughey's performance in his report of the engagement at Cane Hill:

In the re-organization of the Army of the Trans-Mississippi following the defeat at Prairie Grove, a decision was made by General Hindman to disband Shoup's battery due to the poor quality of its guns.  The battery personnel, which had been made up of men detailed from various infantry units were disbanded, the men sent back to their original commands and the officers, including Lieutenants Hughey and Miller were relieved of duty.

By March 1863, First Lieutenant William M. Hughey and Second Lieutenant W. A. Miller, formerly of Shoup's Mountain Battery were organizing a new battery with men taken from the Camp of Instruction at Dardanelle, Arkansas. On April 2, 1863, General Cabell wrote from Clarksville Arkansas to General Cooper:

Service

Action at Fayetteville, Arkansas
The newly formed battery accompanied Brigadier General William L. Cabell on his Fayetteville raid in April 1863. Confederate Brigadier General Cabell departed Ozark, Arkansas, with 900 cavalry and Hughey's Battery with the intent of dislodging the Union from Fayetteville, Arkansas. Approaching the city from the south, the Confederates captured nine Union soldiers near West Fork, Arkansas, at night on April 17. The following morning the Confederates climbed East Mountain and Hughey's Battery fired south into the city. Cabell's cavalry rushed the city streets around 6:00 am intending to attack the Tebbetts House which held the Union command. The attackers halted and waited for cannon fire from the Hughey's Battery stationed on the mountain to damage the headquarters. Confederates pressed their attack into Fayetteville, capturing Union soldiers and destroying a supply train before the Union rallied and repelled the Southern troops. Union soldiers began approaching the Hughey's Battery upon East Mountain under cover. By this time the battery was under attack and out of ammunition forcing its withdrawal.  General Cabell described the battery's effect:

During the Action a Fayetteville, the battery suffered two horses killed, two horses wounded, one man killed and several wounded.  William Hughey was himself wounded in the arm in the battle of Fayetteville. The battery retreated with General Cabell's forces back to Fort Smith.  Cabell occupied Fort Smith through the summer of 1863.

The battery was reorganized on June 8, 1863, and reinforced with a couple of dozen details from Monroe's Cavalry Regiment. By July 30, 1862, Hughey was signing for forage at Fort Smith as Captain, commanding Battery. In the Compiled Service Records of the 26th Arkansas Infantry Regiment there are a handful of entries indicating that some infantrymen had been assigned to Hughey's Battery on September 1, 1863, the day of the Battle of Devil's Backbone. It is unclear if the assignment preceded the battle, took place during the battle, or occurred to facilitate the retreat of Cabell's force after the battle. General Cabel's report on the Battle of Devil's Backbone mentions "the gallantry of Captain [W.M.] Hughey, commanding the battery...." It appears that Monroe's regiment, Hughey's Battery and a company of Morgan's regiment performed quite well in the engagement:

Red River Campaign, Camden Expedition
Hughey's Battery, attached to Colonel William A. Crawford's Brigade, of Major General James Fleming Fagan's  Division was engaged in the Camden Expedition in the spring of 1864, including the actions at Battle of Prairie D'Ane, Battle of Poison Spring, and the Battle of Marks' Mills.

According to Colton Greene's reports for May and June 1864, Hughey's Battery was attached to Marmaduke's Brigade, Colton Greene commanding. This time period would include the Battle at Ditch Bayou, a.k.a. Battle of Lake Chicot, on June 6, 1864. It seems that Colonel Greene thought highly of this unit.

Prices' Missouri Raid
The battery took part in Price's Raid in Missouri during the fall of 1864, assigned to Brigadier General William L. Cabell's brigade of Major General Fagan's Division. The battery is mentioned in Union Army Reports of the Battle of Fort Davidson, also known as the Battle of Pilot Knob, on September 27, 1864:

  The battery apparently lost tow guns and a number of horses during the Second Battle of Independence Missouri on October 21, 1864.

During the remainder of Prices raid, the battery was present or engaged in the following battles:

Price's Missouri Raid, Arkansas-Missouri-Kansas, September–October, 1864
Battle of Fort Davidson, Missouri, September 27, 1864
Fourth Battle of Boonville, Missouri, October 11, 1864
Second Battle of Lexington, Missouri, October 19, 1864
Battle of Little Blue River, Missouri, October 21, 1864
Second Battle of Independence, Missouri, October 21–22, 1864
Battle of Byram's Ford, Missouri, October 22–23, 1864
Battle of Westport, Missouri, October 23, 1864
Battle of Marais des Cygnes, Linn County, Kansas, October 25, 1864
Battle of Mine Creek, Missouri, October 25, 1864
Battle of Marmiton River, Missouri, October 25, 1864
Second Battle of Newtonia, Missouri, October 28, 1864

Final year of the war
On November 19, 1864, General E. Kirby Smith, commanding the Confederate Trans-Mississippi Department, issued Special Orders No. 290, organizing the artillery of the department into battalions. The component batteries rarely, if ever, operated together. They were usually assigned individually to an infantry or cavalry brigade to provide fire support. In this reorganization, Hughey's Battery, armed with 4 guns, and commanded by Capt. John G. Marshall was re-designated as the 8th Arkansas Field Battery and assigned to the 2nd Artillery Battalion, commanded by Major J. H. Pratt.

Surrender
The battery surrendered with General Kirby Smith on May 26, 1865. The date of the military convention between Confederate General Edmund Kirby Smith and Union General Edward Canby for the surrender of the troops and public property in the Trans-Mississippi Department was May 26, 1865, however, it took a while for parole commissioners to be appointed and for public property to be accounted for. As a result, a final report of field artillery which was part of the accounting process, was not completed until June 1, 1865. According to the final accounting, at the time of the surrender, the battery was armed with two x 3-in. rifles; and two x 12-pounder field howitzers. The final report list the four guns as being near Camden, Arkansas.

See also
 List of Arkansas Civil War Confederate units
 Lists of American Civil War Regiments by State
 Confederate Units by State
 Arkansas in the American Civil War
 Arkansas Militia in the Civil War

Notes

References
 Alexander, P. W. (1835). Peter Wellington Alexander papers.
 Arkansas Historical Association. (1942). The Arkansas historical quarterly. Fayetteville: Arkansas Historical Association.
 Sikakis, Stewart, Compendium of the Confederate Armies, Florida and Arkansas, Facts on File, Inc., 1992, 
 United States. (1961). Compiled service records of Confederate soldiers who served in organizations from the State of Arkansas. Washington, D.C.: National Archives, National Archives and Records Service, General Services Administration.
 U.S. War Department, The War of the Rebellion: a Compilation of the Official Records of the Union and Confederate Armies, U.S. Government Printing Office, 1880–1901.
 Woodruff, W. E. (1903). With the light guns in '61-'65: Reminiscences of eleven Arkansas, Missouri and Texas light batteries, in the civil war. Little Rock, Ark: Central printing company.

External links
Edward G. Gerdes Civil War Home Page
The encyclopedia of Arkansas History and Culture
The War of the Rebellion: a Compilation of the Official Records of the Union and Confederate Armies
The Arkansas History Commission, State Archives, Civil War in Arkansas

Units and formations of the Confederate States Army from Arkansas
1865 disestablishments in Arkansas
Military units and formations disestablished in 1865
Military units and formations in Arkansas
Military in Arkansas
1862 establishments in Arkansas
Military units and formations established in 1862
Artillery units and formations of the American Civil War